The 1958–59 NBA season was the Warriors' 13th season in the NBA.

Roster

Regular season

Season standings

x – clinched playoff spot

Record vs. opponents

Game log

Awards and records
 Paul Arizin, NBA All-Star Game
 Paul Arizin, All-NBA Second Team

References

Golden State Warriors seasons
Philadelphia